Clemen Lewis (born 10 October 1983) is a South African rugby union player who made a record 171 appearances for the  from 2006 to 2018. His regular position is hooker.

Career

Youth
This also led to his inclusion in the South African Schools team in 2001.

Despite his inclusion in their senior squad for the 2003 Vodacom Cup, he did not make a first class appearances.

Boland Cavaliers
He was named in the squad for the 2005 Vodacom Cup competition without appearing.

It wasn't until the 2007 Currie Cup Premier Division competition that he established himself in the first team. Five substitute appearances in that competition were followed up by four starts and he has been a first team regular ever since.

In 2012, Lewis was also included in the  squad for the 2012 Super Rugby season, but he failed to make an appearance for them.

Representative rugby
In addition to his S.A. Schools and S.A.Under-19 representation, he was also included in a South African Barbarians (South) team that faced England during the 2012 mid-year rugby test series.

References

1983 births
Living people
People from Wellington, Western Cape
Cape Coloureds
South African rugby union players
Boland Cavaliers players
Rugby union hookers
Rugby union players from the Western Cape